Dzhuneyt Ali (born 5 September 1994) is a Bulgarian professional footballer who plays as a defender for Arda Kardzhali.

References

External links

1994 births
Living people
Bulgarian footballers
Bulgarian people of Turkish descent
First Professional Football League (Bulgaria) players
Second Professional Football League (Bulgaria) players
FC Botev Galabovo players
FC Vereya players
PFC Nesebar players
Neftochimic Burgas players
PFC Beroe Stara Zagora players
Association football defenders